Spaso-Barda is a rural locality (a selo) in Kishertskoye Rural Settlement, Kishertsky District, Perm Krai, Russia. The population was 370 as of 2010. There are 9 streets.

Geography 
Spaso-Barda is located 8 km east of Ust-Kishert (the district's administrative centre) by road. Zapoleno is the nearest rural locality.

References 

Rural localities in Kishertsky District